Mungoshi is a Zimbabwean surname. Notable people with the surname include:
Charles Mungoshi (1947–2019), Zimbabwean writer
David Mungoshi (1949–2020), Zimbabwean novelist, actor, poet and teacher
Jesesi Mungoshi, Zimbabwean actress

Zimbabwean surnames
Bantu-language surnames